Heraclea, Heracleia, or Herakleia was a fortress town of Athamania.

References

Populated places in ancient Epirus
Former populated places in Greece
Lost ancient cities and towns